Antongo Vaovao is a town and commune in Madagascar. It belongs to the district of Morombe, which is a part of Atsimo-Andrefana Region. The population of the commune was estimated to be approximately 7,000 in 2001 commune census.

Only primary schooling is available. The majority 70% of the population of the commune are farmers, while an additional 10% receives their livelihood from raising livestock. The most important crop is lima beans, while other important products are maize, sweet potatoes and cowpeas. Services provide employment for 5% of the population. Additionally fishing employs 15% of the population.

References and notes 

Populated places in Atsimo-Andrefana